Aristotle: Eudemian Ethics is a 2013 book edited by Brad Inwood and Raphael Woolf in which the editors offer a translation of Aristotle's Eudemian Ethics and an introduction to Aristotle's ethical thought as a whole.

References

External links 
Aristotle: Eudemian Ethics

Cambridge University Press books
2013 non-fiction books
Works about Aristotle
Ethics books